Jaren Walter Jackson Sr. (born October 27, 1967) is an American professional basketball coach and former player who is an assistant coach for the Westchester Knicks of the NBA G League. A shooting guard born in New Orleans, Louisiana, Jackson played at Georgetown University from 1985 to 1989 and graduated with a bachelor's degree in finance. He was never drafted into the National Basketball Association (NBA) but played 13 seasons for multiple teams. He is best known for his tenure with the San Antonio Spurs, who he helped win their first NBA championship in 1999.

Legacy

Traveling swingman (1989–1997)
Upon graduating, Jackson was not drafted, but was first signed as a free agent by the New Jersey Nets in 1989. That year he played in only 28 games, and the following season would play in the Continental Basketball Association and the World Basketball League. He had a very short stint with the Golden State Warriors before signing with the Los Angeles Clippers for whom he played just 34 games in the 1992–93 season. The following year, he was signed and played just 29 games for the Portland Trail Blazers, but he was waived by Portland and picked up by the Philadelphia 76ers, where he started his first NBA game on December 17, 1994. Jackson would again be waived and wouldn't return to action until the following year for another very short stint with the Houston Rockets before being signed by the Washington Bullets prior to the 1996–97 season.

It was with the Bullets that Jackson played his longest NBA season, as he played in 75 games for the season as backup to Calbert Cheaney, with an average of 5 points a game and a career-high 53 three-point field goals.

San Antonio Spurs (1997–2001)
In the offseason, following a playoff loss to the eventual champion Chicago Bulls, Jackson signed with the San Antonio Spurs, who had suffered a lottery season the previous year but featured superstar David Robinson and the first pick in the 1997 draft, Tim Duncan. The 1997–98 season would prove to be a personal best for Jackson, as he started in 45 of 82 games and averaged a career-high 8.8 points a game and a new career high of 112 three-pointers for the year. Jackson also saw his most significant playoff action, as the Spurs won in the first round of the playoffs before losing in the conference semifinals. Jackson started in 8 of 9 playoff games and increased his scoring average to 10.2 points for the postseason.

The following year would be shortened to 50 games as a result of a league lockout, but the Spurs would continue to use Jackson as its main back up shooting guard behind veteran Mario Elie. Jackson would play in 47 games, starting in 13 and averaged 6.4 points a game. The Spurs would win the number one seed in the playoffs led by Robinson and Duncan, and open the playoffs with a 3–1 first-round win over the Minnesota Timberwolves, before dominating and sweeping the Los Angeles Lakers in 4 games of the conference semifinals. Against the Lakers Jackson played well, scoring 22 points in game 3 followed by 20 points in game 4 to close the series in which he hit 6 three-point shots. The Spurs would next faced Portland in the conference finals, but were once again dominant, with teammate Sean Elliott hitting a crucial three-point shot to win game 2 and Jackson scoring 19 points in game 3. The Spurs completed another sweep, and would face the New York Knicks in the NBA Finals. Jackson scored 17 points in his first Finals game, and the Spurs would win both games in San Antonio before heading to New York. Despite a win by the Knicks at home in game 3, the Spurs proved simply too dominating, and would win the next two games in Madison Square Garden to win the series and the NBA Championship. Jackson scored 11 points in the title clinching 5th game, and averaged 8.2 points throughout the title run.

Jackson would once again serve as the main backup at shooting guard for the defending champion Spurs the following season, playing in 81 games and starting in 12. The Spurs would end up losing in the first round of the playoffs to the Phoenix Suns mostly due to a season-ending injury to Duncan, and Jackson only played two games in the series. In the 2000–01 season, the Spurs won the best record in the league before losing in the conference finals, but Jackson only played in 16 games for the season and did not play in the postseason as the team had brought in younger guards such as Derek Anderson.

Retirement
Jackson was signed to play for the Orlando Magic for the latter portion of the 2001–02 season, and played in 9 regular season games and 3 playoff games before retiring.

Coaching career
Jackson had served as assistant coach of Fort Wayne Mad Ants with their first and second season in NBA Development League (D-League). Jackson had also returned to the Fort Wayne Mad Ants during the 2014–15 season.

Since retiring as a player, Jackson has held several basketball coaching positions at both the college and minor league level. He has been the head coach of the Saint John Millrats of the National Basketball League of Canada.

Jackson was named the head coach of the National Basketball League of Canada's Ottawa SkyHawks on November 25, 2013.

On January 19, 2021, the Westchester Knicks announced that they had hired Jackson as assistant coach.

Personal life
Jackson married fellow Hoya Terri Carmichael Jackson, the director of operations at the Women's National Basketball Players Association. They are the parents of Jaren Jackson Jr., who played college basketball for Michigan State before being selected 4th overall in the 2018 NBA draft by the Memphis Grizzlies.

References

External links
Career statistics

1967 births
Living people
20th-century African-American sportspeople
21st-century African-American people
African-American basketball coaches
African-American basketball players
American expatriate basketball people in France
American men's basketball coaches
American men's basketball players
ASVEL Basket players
Basketball coaches from Louisiana
Basketball players from New Orleans
Continental Basketball Association coaches
Fort Wayne Fury players
Fort Wayne Mad Ants coaches
Georgetown Hoyas men's basketball coaches
Georgetown Hoyas men's basketball players
Golden State Warriors players
Houston Rockets players
La Crosse Catbirds players
Los Angeles Clippers players
New Jersey Nets players
Orlando Magic players
Philadelphia 76ers players
Portland Trail Blazers players
San Antonio Spurs players
Shooting guards
Sportspeople from New Orleans
Undrafted National Basketball Association players
Washington Bullets players
Wichita Falls Texans players